The following is a list of Horrible Histories episodes which is a revival of the 2009 TV series of the same name, both based on the book series of the same.

Overview

Series 6 (2015)
This was the first series to dedicate each episode to a special subject or theme. Series 6 took a look at some of history's most Rotten Rulers, a selection played by guest stars. The series began with King John for the day of the Magna Carta's 800th anniversary.

The Specials II (2016)
In 2016 three special episodes were produced and shown throughout the year, each marking a historical milestone. This included 400 years since Shakespeare's death and 350 years since the Great Fire of London, as well as a special for the BBC's 'Love to Read' campaign.

Series 7 (2017-18)
In 2017 another full-length series of fifteen themed episodes began airing, the premier a month ahead of the rest of the series. The last five episodes were not aired on TV until the following spring but were available on DVD from November.

Between September 5 and September 23, the BBC ran a competition to write a sketch for Horrible Histories with the winning entry by Abigail Innes (age 8) from Hull being filmed as part of the seventh series. Her sketch was shown in the last episode of the series.

Series 8 (2019-2021) 
In June 2019 an eighth series began airing on CBBC, and for the first time ever, the next episode was exclusively available on BBC iPlayer. This is also the first series where a selection of guest stars have helped present the show with Rattus for several episodes. But the format remains much the same.

Series 9 (2021-22)
The ninth series began with 3 episodes presented predominantly through animation, with subsequent episodes in the more regular format following from late 2021.

See also
 List of Horrible Histories (2009 TV series) episodes

References

Horrible Histories